Benjamin Hoadly (14 November 167617 April 1761) was an English clergyman, who was successively Bishop of Bangor, of Hereford, of Salisbury, and finally of Winchester. He is best known as the initiator of the Bangorian Controversy.

Life
He was educated at St Catharine's College, Cambridge and ordained a priest in 1700. He was rector of St Peter-le-Poer, London, from 1704 to 1724, and of St Leonard's, Streatham, from 1710 to 1723. His participation in controversy began at the beginning of his career, when he advocated conformity of the religious rites from the Scottish and English churches for the sake of union. He became a leader of the low church and found favour with the Whig party.

He battled with Francis Atterbury, who was the spokesman for the high church group and Tory leader on the subject of passive obedience and non-resistance (i.e. obedience of divines that would not involve swearing allegiance or changing their eucharistic rites but would also not involve denunciation of the Established Church practices). The House of Commons, dominated by Whigs, recommended him to Queen Anne, and he became rector of Streatham in 1710. When George I succeeded to the throne, he became chaplain to the King and made bishop of Bangor in 1716. He took up the See on the confirmation of his election, at St Mary-le-Bow on 17 March 1716.

In 1717, his sermon on "The Nature of the Kingdom of Christ" provoked the Bangorian controversy. He was then translated three more times, taking up different bishoprics. He maintained that the eucharist was purely a commemorative act without any divine intervention. During his time as bishop, he rarely visited his dioceses and lived, instead, in London, where he was very active in politics.

From later summer 1722 to January 1725 Hoadly published letters on contemporary topics, articulating his Whig principles and defending the Glorious Revolution of 1688. The Revolution had created "that Limited Form of Government which is our only Security" and such a government secured freedom of expression, without which Britons would suffer "all the Mischiefs, of Darkness in the Intellectual World, of Baseness in the Moral World, and of Slavery in the Political World". Hoadly also criticised the Pretender, who issued a declaration that he would extinguish opposition. Hoadly wrote that he would impose uniformity on all if he ruled: "Not only that he must destroy your Civil and Religious Rights, but that he plainly before-hand has here told You, to your Face, He will do so".

William Hogarth (1697–1764) painted his portrait as Bishop of Winchester and "Prelate of the Most Noble Order of the Garter" about 1743, etched by Bernard Baron (1696–1762). Hoadly's son Benjamin aided Hogarth with his The Analysis of Beauty.

Selected works
A Defence of the Reasonableness of Conformity (1707)
A Plain Account of the Nature and End of the Sacrament of the Lord's Supper (1735)
The Repeal of the Corporation and Test Acts (1736)

Bibliography

Guglielmo Sanna, Religione e vita publica nell' Inghilterra del '700: Le avventure di Benjamin Hoadly, Milan, FrancoAngeli Storia, 2012

Notes

Further reading
 William Gibson: Enlightenment Prelate: Benjamin Hoadly, 1676–1761. Cambridge 2004, .

External links
 

1676 births
1761 deaths
18th-century Church of England bishops
Alumni of St Catharine's College, Cambridge
Bishops of Bangor
Bishops of Hereford
Bishops of Salisbury
Bishops of Winchester
English theologians
Chancellors of the Order of the Garter
18th-century Welsh Anglican bishops
17th-century Anglican theologians
18th-century Anglican theologians